Rina (Irena) Tannenbaum (born December 13, 1953) is an Israeli/American materials scientist and chemical engineer and presently Professor in the Program of Chemical and Molecular Engineering in the Department of Materials Science and Engineering at the State University of New York at Stony Brook. She received her Ph.D. in chemical engineering from the Swiss Federal Institute of Technology in Zurich.

She has performed research in numerous areas including potential applications of carbon nanotubes, self-assembly, block copolymers, cellulose nanocomposites and tissue engineering. She has authored more than 150 publications in these fields that were published in top-tier journals, such as those of the American Chemical Society, Wiley and Elsevier .

For her work she has received many awards and was involved in a variety of professional activities. For example, she was a co-organizer of Symposium Y at the Spring 2001 Materials Research Society Meeting, was a plenary speaker at the Third International Conference on Polymer Behavior (ICPB3) in 2008, and delivered the WISE 10th Anniversary Distinguished Lecture at the University of Southern California in the Fall 2009., To date she has published over 200 peer-reviewed articles, reviews and conference proceedings.

Controversies 

In 2011 an audit accuses professors Allen Tannenbaum and his wife Rina Tannenbaum that they violated Georgia Institute of Technology and State policies by working simultaneously at Georgia Tech and Technion-Israel Institute of Technology. The report contended $1.4 million in salary and federally sponsored travel to Israel for Allen Tannenbaum and $750,000 for Rina Tannenbaum.

References

External links
Rina Tannenbaum's Activity
Rina Tannenbaum's Plenary
Rina Tannenbaum's Distinguished Lecture
Rina Tannenbaum's Home Page

1953 births
Israeli chemical engineers
Israeli women chemists
Living people
American chemical engineers
American people of Israeli descent
Israeli expatriates in Switzerland
Israeli women engineers
American women engineers
20th-century American Jews
Israeli Jews
Stony Brook University faculty
ETH Zurich alumni
21st-century women engineers
American women academics
21st-century American Jews
20th-century American women
21st-century American women
American expatriates in Switzerland